Miller–Pence Farm is a historic home and farm located near Greenville, Monroe County, West Virginia. The main farmhouse was built in 1828, with five modifications through 1910.  It began as a two-story Federal style brick home on a coursed rubble foundation.  A two-story addition dated to the 1880s, with a cut stone foundation, has board-and-batten siding, evoking the Carpenter Gothic architectural style.  Also on the property are a former slave school (c. 1870), second school (c. 1870), three barns (c. 1880–1920), tractor shed (c. 1920), equipment shed (c. 1930), corn crib and ruins of Miller's Frontier House (c. 1770), spring box (c. 1778), original road cut (c. 1800), and the Miller-Halstead Cemetery (c. 1775).

It was listed on the National Register of Historic Places in 2006.

References

Houses on the National Register of Historic Places in West Virginia
Federal architecture in West Virginia
Gothic Revival architecture in West Virginia
Houses completed in 1770
Houses in Monroe County, West Virginia
National Register of Historic Places in Monroe County, West Virginia
Farms on the National Register of Historic Places in West Virginia
1770 establishments in Virginia